Kundlika Dam, is an earthfill dam on Kundlika river near Majalgaon in state of Maharashtra in India.

Specifications

Purpose
 Irrigation

See also
 Dams in Maharashtra
 List of reservoirs and dams in India

References

Dams in Beed district
Dams completed in 1986
1986 establishments in Maharashtra